The 1984 British Formula Three Championship was the 34th season of British Formula Three. Johnny Dumfries took the BARC/BRDC Marlboro British Formula 3 Championship.

Johnny Dumfries got a drive with Team BP for the season, and ran way with the British title. The Earl of Dumfries, calling himself “Johnny Dumfries” for racing purposes, clinched the title, with three rounds still remaining. His closure rival for most of the season was Russell Spence, but pipped to second place in Championship by the consistent point finishing of Allen Berg.

BARC/BRDC Marlboro British F3 Championship 
Champion:  Johnny Dumfries

Runner Up:  Allen Berg

Class B Champion:  Keith Fine

Results

Marlboro British Formula 3 Championship

Championship Tables

Class A

Class B

References

1984 in British motorsport
British Formula Three Championship seasons
1984 in Formula Three